Route 381, also known as Port Anson Road, is a  north–south highway in northern Newfoundland in the Canadian province of Newfoundland and Labrador. It serves as the only road connection to the communities on Sunday Cove Island.

Route description

Route 381 begins on mainland Newfoundland at an intersection with Route 380 (Beothuck Trail) at the westernmost edge of Roberts Arm. It heads northwest through rural hilly terrain for a few kilometres before crossing a Causeway over a channel onto Sunday Cove Island. The highway now curves to the east and winds its way along the island to pass through Port Anson before coming to an end in Miles Cove near the harbour. As with most highways in Newfoundland and Labrador, the entire length of Route 381 is entirely a two-lane highway.

Major intersections

References

381